Hernán Medina Calderón (born August 29, 1937 in Yarumal, in the Antioquia Department, Colombia) is a retired Colombian road racing cyclist who won the Vuelta a Colombia in 1960 and the Vuelta a Guatemala in 1958. He also finished as runner up in the Vuelta a Colombia in 1959 and 1961. He competed in the individual road race and team time trial events at the 1960 Summer Olympics.

References

1937 births
Living people
People from Yarumal
Colombian male cyclists
Olympic cyclists of Colombia
Cyclists at the 1960 Summer Olympics
Sportspeople from Antioquia Department